Castniidae, or castniid moths, is a small family of moths with fewer than 200 species: The majority are Neotropical with some in Australia and a few in south-east Asia. These are medium-sized to very large moths, usually with drab, cryptically-marked forewings and brightly coloured hindwings. They have clubbed antennae and are day flying, and are often mistaken for butterflies. Indeed, some previous classification systems placed this family within the butterflies or skippers. The Neotropical species are commonly known as giant butterfly-moths, the Australian and Asian species as sun moths. The larvae are internal feeders, often on roots of epiphytes or on monocotyledons.

Taxonomy
Subfamily Castniinae
Tribe Castniini
Amauta
Athis
Castnia
Castniomera
Corybantes
Eupalamides
Feschaeria
Geyeria
Haemonides
Hista
Imara
Insigniocastnia
Ircila
Lapaeumides
Spilopastes
Synpalamides
Telchin
Xanthocastnia
Yagra
Tribe Gazerini
Castnius
Ceretes
Divana
Duboisvalia
Frostetola
Gazera
Mirocastnia
Oiticicastnia
Paysandisia
Prometheus
Riechia
Tosxampila
Zegara
Tribe Synemonini
Synemon
Subfamily Tascininae
Tascina
Subfamily incertae sedis
†Dominickus

References

External links
Natural History Museum Lepidoptera genus list
Tree of Life
Australian Moths Online
 Sun Moths
Australian Castniidae
Castniidae Images

 
Moth families